Kaname Island is a small, isolated island which lies about  northwest of Padda Island in Lützow-Holm Bay, Antarctica. The island was discovered by the Japanese Antarctic Research Expedition (JARE) during helicopter reconnaissance flights from East Ongul Island in the 1969–70 season. The name "Kaname-jima" (chief or important island) was given by JARE Headquarters in 1972.

See also 
 List of antarctic and sub-antarctic islands

References

Islands of Queen Maud Land
Prince Harald Coast